Rick Scruggs (born November 22, 1955) is an American college basketball coach.  He served as the head men's basketball coach at North Greenville University (1986–1989), Belmont Abbey College (1991–1994), the University of Pikeville (1994–1995), Milligan College (1994–1995), Gardner–Webb University (1995–2010), and Mars Hill College (2012–2016), compiling a career decor of 408–409.

Head coaching record

22 wins vacated in 2004

References

External links
 Mars Hill profile

1955 births
Living people
American men's basketball coaches
Appalachian State Mountaineers men's basketball coaches
Belmont Abbey Crusaders men's basketball coaches
College men's basketball head coaches in the United States
Francis Marion Patriots men's basketball coaches
Gardner–Webb Runnin' Bulldogs men's basketball coaches
Mars Hill Lions men's basketball coaches
Milligan Buffaloes men's basketball coaches
North Greenville Crusaders men's basketball coaches
Pikeville Bears men's basketball coaches
University of Georgia alumni